Trenčianske Bohuslavice is a village and municipality in Nové Mesto nad Váhom District in the Trenčín Region of western Slovakia.

History
In historical records the village was first mentioned in 1208.

Geography
The municipality lies at an altitude of 198 metres and covers an area of 6.405 km². It has a population of about 947 people.

References

External links

 https://www.trencianskebohuslavice.sk Official page
 http://www.statistics.sk/mosmis/eng/run.html

Villages and municipalities in Nové Mesto nad Váhom District